Herrad Frey (25 August 1933 – 19 November 2022) was a French former archer who represented France at the 1972 Summer Olympic Games in archery.

Career 
Frey finished 27th in the women's individual event with a score of 2230 points.

References

External links 
 Profile on worldarchery.org

1933 births
2022 deaths
French female archers
Olympic archers of France
Archers at the 1972 Summer Olympics